Sangue di zingara ("Gipsy's blood") is a 1956 Italian melodrama film co-written and directed by Maria Basaglia.

Cast  
 Maria Piazzai as  Teodora
Eloisa Cianni as  Celeste
Gino Leurini as Donato
Maurizio Arena as  Tore
Olga Solbelli as  Donato's mother
Aldo Silvani as  Don Luigi
 Nada Cortese as Rosa

See also    
 List of Italian films of 1956

References

External links

1956 films
Italian drama films
1956 drama films
1950s Italian films
Melodrama films
Italian black-and-white films